Edmonton-Whitemud is a provincial electoral district for the Legislative Assembly of Alberta, Canada. In 1989, its constituents unseated the Premier of the day, Donald Getty, by voting for Liberal candidate Percy Wickman.

The district was represented by Dave Hancock who was in his fourth term as the Member of the Legislative Assembly. Hancock has also served as Minister of Justice twice, Attorney General and prior to that as Minister of Intergovernmental and Aboriginal Affairs.

On December 15, 2006, Hancock was made Minister of Health and Wellness in Premier Ed Stelmach's cabinet. He later served as Deputy Premier under Stelmach's successor Alison Redford. Following Redford's resignation as Premier, Hancock was named as her replacement and sworn into office on March 23, 2014, meaning the Edmonton-Whitemud district was the seat of the Premier of Alberta for the second time.

History
The electoral district was created in the 1971 boundary redistribution from the electoral districts of Strathcona Centre and Strathcona West.

The 2010 boundary redistribution saw the riding significantly altered. It lost all land south of Anthony Henday Drive to the new electoral district of Edmonton-South West. It also lost land along the east boundary with Edmonton-Rutherford. The old line established in 2003 ran along 119 Street. It was pushed west to run continuously along Whitemud Creek.

Boundary history

Representation history

The electoral district was created in the 1971 boundary redistribution. The first representative was former Canadian Football League player Don Getty. Getty had previously represented the electoral district of Strathcona West. The 1971 election saw Getty easily win the new district to pick it up for the Progressive Conservatives.

Getty won a larger majority in 1975 and he retired for the first time from the legislature in 1979. His replacement was Progressive Conservative Peter Knaak, who easily held the district for a single term before leaving in 1982. Robert Alexander took over as the Progressive Conservative in 1982.

Alexander resigned November 5, 1985, so that Getty, who had just been elected as leader of the Progressive Conservatives and premier of the province, could have his seat back. Getty easily won the by-election held on December 11, 1985. Less than a year later Getty called his first election as premier. He easily won the district back along with a majority government across the province.

The 1989 general election would turn out to be one of the most memorable in Alberta political history. Getty was defeated in a closely contested race by Liberal candidate Percy Wickman. The result was a surprise as Getty's party had won a majority across the province. The trouble for Getty's campaign started when he skipped an all-candidates forum which Wickman had put a rubber chicken in his place. He was also criticized heavily even by his own party members for running a billion dollars in spending announcements.

Wickman held the seat for one term before running in the Edmonton-Rutherford electoral district in 1993. His replacement was Liberal candidate Mike Percy, who won a comfortable margin over Dave Hancock. Percy only held the district for one term.

Hancock ran as the Progressive Conservative candidate for the second time in the 1997 general election.  He was re-elected three more times. Hancock became interim Premier of Alberta in March 2015. The end of his tenure came in September of that year when Jim Prentice was elected as leader of the PCs and subsequently sworn in as premier. Hancock resigned from the legislature around the same time. A by-election was held in October, and the successful candidate was Stephen Mandel, whom Prentice had named as Minister for Health, despite not holding a seat in the assembly. Mandel was defeated in May 2015 by Bob Turner of the NDP.

Legislature results

1971 general election

1975 general election

1979 general election

1982 general election

1985 by-election

1986 general election

1989 general election

1993 general election

1997 general election

2001 general election

2004 general election

2008 general election

2012 general election

2014 by-election

2015 General Election

2019 general election

Senate nominee results

2004 Senate nominee election district results

Voters had the option of selecting 4 Candidates on the Ballot

2012 Senate nominee election district results

Student Vote results

2004 election

On November 19, 2004 a Student Vote was conducted at participating Alberta schools to parallel the 2004 Alberta general election results. The vote was designed to educate students and simulate the electoral process for persons who have not yet reached the legal majority. The vote was conducted in 80 of the 83 provincial electoral districts with students voting for actual election candidates. Schools with a large student body that reside in another electoral district had the option to vote for candidates outside of the electoral district then where they were physically located.

2012 election

References

External links
The Legislative Assembly of Alberta

Alberta provincial electoral districts
Politics of Edmonton
1971 establishments in Alberta